The Mixe tree frog (Megastomatohyla mixe) is a species of frog in the family Hylidae endemic to Mexico. Its natural habitats are subtropical or tropical moist montane forests and rivers. It is threatened by habitat loss.

References

Megastomatohyla
Amphibians described in 1965
Taxonomy articles created by Polbot